The Colégio Dom Diogo de Sousa is a Catholic school located in São Vicente, Braga, Portugal.

It's one of the most acclaimed and renowned schools in Portugal, usually in the top five nationwide it is also one of the most privileged schools in the whole country. 

Having good sport facilities like one basketball field, one volleyball field, a handball field, a football camp in the lower part, a huge football camp on the up part and two indoor swimming polls. It has renovated classrooms containing interactive boards and top qualities air conditioner. This Catholic school also embraces different religions, and people from various countries.

History

It is owned by the Archdiocese of Braga. It was established in 1949 and the school inaugurated a new building in 1956.

List of Principals
Pe. Joaquim António Alves (1949-1951)
Mons. Elísio Fernandes de Araújo (1951-1991)
Pe. António José Gomes Marques (1991-2003)
Pe Cândido Azevedo de Sá (2003-now)

References

External links
 Official webpage .

Educational institutions established in 1949
Catholic schools in Portugal
Buildings and structures in Braga
1949 establishments in Portugal
Private schools in Portugal